Combretocarpus is a monotypic genus of tree in the Anisophylleaceae family. The generic name  is from the Greek, referring to the resemblance of its fruit to that of the genus Combretum.  The Plant List recognises the single species Combretocarpus rotundatus.

Description
The fissured bark is grey-brown to brown. The bisexual flowers are yellow. The hard heavy wood is used in heavy construction and for indoor floors and panels.

Distribution and habitat
Combretocarpus rotundatus grows naturally in Sumatra, Peninsular Malaysia and Borneo. Its habitat is swamp and kerangas forests.

References

Anisophylleaceae
Monotypic Cucurbitales genera
Trees of Sumatra
Trees of Peninsular Malaysia
Trees of Borneo
Least concern plants
Taxa named by Joseph Dalton Hooker